Malanday is a settlement and one of the constituent barangays in the city of Valenzuela, Metro Manila, Philippines. It is located in the northern section of the city bordering Meycauayan in the province of Bulacan. The name Malanday is said to derive from a phrase meaning 'a bowl plate' in the Filipino language.

Demographics
The area is 295.60 km2 (114.13 sq mi) with a population of 19,060 and density of 61/km2 (160/sq mi)

Sitio(s) 
There are a total of five Sitios in the Barangay of Malanday
 Sitio Hulo
 Sitio Libo (divided into two: Libo I and Libo II)
 Sitio Lingahan
 Sitio Umboy

Education
There are a total of four Schools located here in the barangay

Public Schools
These are the schools operated by the Government of Valenzuela:
 Andres Fernando Elementary School
 Malanday National Highschool

Private Schools
These are the schools which is not operated by the Government of Valenzuela:
Emmaus Christian School
High Horizons Learning Center

Some residential parts of the barangay have Tutorial Centers or offers Tutor to the students.

Festivals
Residents celebrate the annual fiesta of Santo Kristo on the last Sunday of April.

Major events in the fiesta is managed and organized by Hearts of Jesus and Mary Parish with the cooperation of the Church members in every Sitio. Events includes Contest like Best Arch Design and Streetdance Competition. The Church also organizes the Morning Procession and Evening Procession or the Sagala offered to Señor Santo Kristo and the Pontifical High Mass every morning and evening.

Meanwhile, other events like games and parties in some Sitio are voluntarily organized by the residents of every Sitio or specific compounds.

Landmarks
Landmarks include Red Ribbon, Jollibee Malanday, and Puregold Malanday located on McArthur Highway. Andres Fernando Elementary School (AFES) Malanday National High School and the 3S Centers are located on M.H. Del Pilar St. Other known landmarks in Malanday include the Andres Fernando Elementary School, Malanday Market, the Malanday Bus Terminal, the VSCA Cock Fighting Arena and the Hearts of Jesus and Mary Parish. The transmitter facility of radio station DZRH (one of the Philippines' oldest radio stations owned by Manila Broadcasting Company) is also located in Malanday.

Notable Events

2012 Floodings
In 2012, Malanday experienced intense flooding brought by heavy rains. Malanday is one of the 20 barangays under state of calamity declared by the Local Government. As of August 5, 2012, about 200 families were residing in city evacuation centers.

Lingahan Fire
On December 11, 2015, at 11 pm, a fire occurred on the roads of Sitio Lingahan, Malanday.  The fire blazed through more than 200 houses. One man was found dead in a nearby pond after the fire. The families first evacuated to the Hearts of Jesus and Mary Parish, but they moved to Malanday National High School after finding relief there.

References

External links

Valenzuela, Philippines official site

Barangays of Metro Manila
Valenzuela, Metro Manila